Honiatycze  is a village in the administrative district of Gmina Werbkowice, within Hrubieszów County, Lublin Voivodeship, in eastern Poland.

The village is divided into a number of hamlets: Darmocha, Karczunek, Niemirówka, Wygon, and Zagrobla.

References

Honiatycze